Kelvin Harrison Jr. (born July 23, 1994) is an American actor. He is the recipient of such accolades as a Screen Actors Guild Award and nominations for a British Academy Film Award, Gotham Award, an Independent Spirit Award.

He began his career with small roles in the 2013 films Ender's Game and 12 Years a Slave. His breakthrough performance came as Travis in the 2017 horror film It Comes at Night, and in 2019 he gained wider recognition for his work in Luce and Waves. He then appeared in films such as The High Note (2020), The Trial of the Chicago 7 (2020), Cyrano (2021) and Elvis (2022).

Early life and education
Harrison was born in New Orleans, Louisiana, to musicians Shirlita and Kelvin Harrison. He grew up in the Garden District and later moved to The Westbank. He studied studio engineering and marketing, before moving to Los Angeles, California to pursue acting, where he began taking acting classes. He is also a skilled musician, mainly playing jazz and gospel on the piano, trumpet, as well as singing. His father was trained by Ellis Marsalis and grew up with Harry Connick Jr.  Harrison studied under Jason Marsalis, recorded with Delfeayo Marsalis, and met Wynton Marsalis.

Harrison attended a private high school, where he was one of the few black kids in his class and struggled to fit in. He originally went to  Loyola University New Orleans to major in studio engineering as his father felt he would excel in music. Harrison ultimately transferred to the University of New Orleans for film, with the goal of writing and directing his own films.

Career
In 2012, Harrison was cast in Ender's Game, based on the 1985 novel. He was upgraded to day-player and interacted with actors such as Viola Davis, Harrison Ford, and Ben Kingsley. Harrison credits Davis with making him take acting more seriously. He then had a small role in 12 Years a Slave. Harrison would later appear in an episode of WGN America's Underground and the 2016 remake of Roots, both of which were produced in his home state of Louisiana. That same year, the actor had a small role in Nate Parker's The Birth of a Nation. Harrison was initially hesitant to participate in Roots in part because it would be his fourth portrayal of a slave, and he did not have fond memories of watching the original as a child. In retrospect, Harrison realized just how different the projects were. In the meantime, Harrison landed a supporting role on Fox miniseries Shots Fired  as well as a recurring role as Touie Dacey on Crackle's StartUp 

Harrison began the year with a small supporting role in the Netflix acquired Dee Rees' Mudbound, which opened at the Sundance Film Festival to critical acclaim. Later that year, he played the role of Travis in Trey Edward Shults' 2017 psychological horror film It Comes at Night. The film focuses on a family hiding in a forest as the Earth is taken over by a highly contagious disease. The film had its premiere at the Overlook Film Festival at Timberline Lodge in Oregon on April 29, 2017 and was theatrically released on June 9, 2017 in the United States by A24, was received positively by critics and grossed over $19 million worldwide. Harrison received praise for his performance, getting nominated for Breakthrough Actor at the Gotham Awards that year. He has credited the role for giving him a reason to continue his acting career.

In 2018, Harrison notably starred in three films that premiered at the Sundance Film Festival, which were Monsters and Men, Assassination Nation & Monster. In Reinaldo Marcus Green's Monsters and Men, he portrays Zyrick, a gifted teenage baseball player that becomes politically awakened after seeing a video of a man murdered by the police. In Sam Levinson's Assassination Nation he has a smaller role as Mason, a friend of the female protagonists and in Anthony Mandler's Monster, based on the Walter Dean Myers novel of the same name, Harrison plays Steve Harmon, a seventeen-year-old honour student whose world comes crashing down around him when he is charged with felony murder. Assassination Nation and Monsters and Men both got releases in the same year while Monster acquired a distribution deal with Netflix in 2021. He followed these up with supporting roles in the dramas Jinn and JT LeRoy.

2019 saw Harrison starring in two films that premiered at the Sundance Film Festival, social thriller Luce  and psychological thriller The Wolf Hour, both starring Naomi Watts. For his titular role in Julius Onah's Luce alongside Octavia Spencer and Tim Roth, Harrison received critical acclaim as the all-star high school athlete and accomplished public speaker born in war-torn Eritrea adopted in the United States. Justin Chang of the Los Angeles Times wrote, "Harrison's performance, at once slippery and surgically precise, compounds that ambiguity in ingenious fashion. He exhibits a quality that might have seemed like mere self-consciousness in a different actor's hands. Harrison was nominated for Best Male Lead at the Independent Spirit Awards for his performance in the film.

Harrison later played Jesse in Nabil Elderkin's directorial debut Gully. The film had its world premiere at the Tribeca Film Festival on April 27, 2019  and eventually found a national theatrical release on June 4, 2021. Harrison's major breakthrough of the year came with Waves, which premiered to critical acclaim at the Telluride Film Festival on August 30, 2019 and found him reuniting with It Comes at Night writer & director Trey Edward Shults. In the film, Harrison plays Tyler Williams, a popular high school senior and competitive wrestler whose life goes into disarray after suffering a career-ending injury. Shults stated that he wrote and tailored the role for Harrison, wanting to work with him again after their previous collaboration. Harrison's performance in the film received rave reviews, with many critics favorably comparing and contrasting it to his performance in Luce. IndieWire's Eric Kohn stated that the two performances pushed him forward as 'the preeminent face of disgruntled teenage life'. The film is notable for widening his international exposure, leading to a BAFTA Rising Star Award nomination. He capped off the year with a supporting performance as musician Teddy Greene in the first season of Epix's Godfather of Harlem alongside Forest Whitaker.

The first half of 2020 saw Harrison venturing into more lighthearted and comedic roles, ranging from his studio debut in a smaller supporting role in Stella Meghie's romance film The Photograph to the male lead in Nisha Ganatra's musical comedy-drama The High Note. In the latter Harrison plays David Cliff, a singer-songwriter who acts as the love interest to Dakota Johnson's Maggie. To prepare for the film and its soundtrack, Harrison worked with a vocal coach for 45 minutes a day, to expand his range, and took guitar lessons. He ended the year with a portrayal of revolutionary socialist Fred Hampton in Aaron Sorkin's biographical ensemble courtroom drama The Trial of the Chicago 7, It was released in selected theaters on September 25, 2020, and began streaming digitally on Netflix on October 16. The film was nominated for six Academy Awards and Harrison and the rest of the cast won the Screen Actors Guild Award for Outstanding Performance by a Cast in a Motion Picture.

In 2021, Harrison portrayed Christian in Joe Wright's Cyrano, a musical film adaptation of the Off-Broadway play by Erica Schmidt, itself based on the 1897 Edmond Rostand play Cyrano de Bergerac. Harrison was slated to appear in the second season of HBO's Euphoria, which would have reunited him with Assassination Nation director Sam Levinson, but dropped out due to conflicting schedules attributed to the COVID-19 pandemic.

Harrison portrayed iconic musician B.B. King in Baz Luhrmann's Elvis, a biopic about the musician of the same name.

Upcoming projects

In March 2021, he was cast in the titular role of classic composer Joseph Bologne in Chevalier, directed by Stephen Williams. In August 2021, it was announced that Harrison will star in Barry Jenkins's follow-up to The Lion King, as the voice of young Scar. In January 2022, it was reported that Harrison will portray the artist Jean-Michel Basquiat in Samo Lives, a biopic that will reunite him with Luce director Julius Onah.

Filmography

Film

Television

Music video

Awards and nominations

References

External links 

1994 births
Living people
Male actors from New Orleans
Loyola University New Orleans alumni
University of New Orleans alumni
American male television actors
American male film actors
African-American male actors
Outstanding Performance by a Cast in a Motion Picture Screen Actors Guild Award winners
21st-century African-American people